Daniel Fuchs (born 1966 in Alzenau) and Geo Fuchs (born 1969 in Frankfurt am Main) are an artist couple who are known for their conceptual photography series in numerous international exhibitions.

Artistic biography
In 1992, Daniel and Geo Fuchs started  their common photographic work. From the beginning, they focused on producing series of photographs with a strong conceptual approach.

The prerequisite for their work is an intense analysis of their chosen subject; the production of a series usually takes several months or even years of research, collecting of material, image selection, and test runs.

From an historical art perspective, their oeuvre belongs to concept art; objectivity, staging, and a wealth of detail.

In the beginning, until about 1996, the artist duo's interest was concentrated on topics like ‘Homelessness’, ’Trans-Sexuality’ and ‘Mental Illness’.

Until the year 2008, Daniel and Geo Fuchs mainly worked with large format camera and tripod, a relatively slow, time-consuming process.

In 2009, with the entry of new media, the artist duo began to experiment with digital techniques.

Concept and aesthetics
Daniel and Geo Fuchs’ photographs have in common, that they fabricate on first view a feel of ’yes - I got it ‘ or ‘yeah that’s obvious’. But intuitively you're pushed to take a closer look, check out the details and arrangements, and all the sudden you ask yourself, what in the moment, while the image was taken, actually existed and what not. Thereby it doesn't matter, whether it is about an arrangement of photographed miniatures like in the ‘Toy Giants’ series or a mountain range like in “Nature and Destruction”.

Independent, whether the images were produced in nature, in an archive or a studio, the viewer will realize, that reality and fiction must have turned into one - how little or how much depends on the concept of the specific work series. Ambiguity is a central component in the work of Daniel & Geo Fuchs and exists in multiple regards. The subtle pretense of something, what can’t be real and if at all, only under different circumstances is one of them. Another one is the balancing act between the extremes - there is hardly a work series, which does not live of antagonists, like - death and esthetics, beauty and destruction, perfectionism and decay. Examples are the series ‘Forces’ and ‘Nature and Destruction’.

Often one work phase of Daniel & Geo Fuchs mounts already into the next one, as theme and project cycles overlap or run parallel.

Due to their large interest in the environment, Daniel & Geo Fuchs developed a strong affinity for that, what first needs to be discovered, is still hidden in the dark or even secret and subsequently for the fascinating world of collections and archives. Visual proofs are the series ‘Conserving’, ‘Toy Giants’ and ‘STASI - Secret Rooms’.

Work series
Since the beginning of their international career until now, Daniel & Geo Fuchs’  œuvre can be ordered into seven large projects: Conserving (1998), Famous Eyes (2000), STASI – Secret Rooms (2006), Toy Giants (2006), Forces (2010), Nature and Destruction and – the latest project – The Halva Project (since 2014).

The dead bodies, photographed for the ‘Conserving’ series, have in common that all of them were inserted in formalin to achieve the best possible and durable conservation. Some of them have already existed for several hundred years. In a time when photography did not exist, as a medium ‘to freeze/keep the moment” and provide a visual memory, this process was the alternative and in a certain sense an own form/variety of sculpture became established, which Daniel and Geo Fuchs have emulated for their project. The themes of life, death, aesthetics and uneasiness touch each other in a similar way to the series ‘Conserving’, which is organized in three topics - fish, animals, humans.

The fascination, created by the photographs of these preserved creatures, inspired the Berlin band Rammstein to cooperate with Daniel and Geo Fuchs. The artist duo developed the main art concept for the band's third album, Mutter (Mother), 2001, which included the general aesthetic appeal of all singles released and the cover of the ‘Mutter’ Album, which stirred up a controversial discussion in public media. The cover shows a baby that died at birth almost 200 years ago. The baby is conserved in alcohol and was photographed by Daniel Fuchs and Geo Fuchs for their book "Conserving". The promotional photos were also shot by Daniel and Geo Fuchs. All pictures are inspired by original photos in their book "Conserving".

Daniel & Geo Fuchs work series Famous Eyes, focuses exclusively on the human eye. Many artists, architects and curators, including Louise Bourgeois, Sophie Calle, Sir Norman Foster, Andreas Gursky, Jürgen Klauke, David LaChapelle, Sarah Lucas, Paul McCarthy, Jonathan Meese, Shirin Neshat, Dennis Oppenheim, Katharina Sieverding, Harald Szeemann and Sam Taylor-Wood, were photographed for this series. Although the focus of this series is on a single sensory organ, the artwork executed in the form of a collage (collage style) allows a deep insight into the private personality of the photographed person.

The photography series ‘Toy Giants established Daniel and Geo Fuchs popularity on a broader level within the international audience/public. The initial spark was their connection with the collector Selim Varol, who owns one of the largest toy and street art collections in the world. For ‘Toy Giants’ the artist duo established relations between toy figures of all genres like, Batman, Superman, Godzilla, Kill Bill and many others and created with the images a new narrative of their stories.

The miniature sized, protagonists of ‘Toy Giants’, were photographed with a large format camera, and presented in exhibitions in the scale of real existing people, which invites the viewer to participate in an interaction of staging and reality.‘STASI - Secret Rooms’ demanded a lot of time for research and stressful, extensive paperwork, to gain access to buildings and archives, which were generally closed to the public.

For this project, Daniel and Geo Fuchs photographed rooms representing the former power/ authority of the East Germany government: wiretapped rooms, locations of physical violence, torture, and psycho-terror - and yet it is not a documentary in the classical sense. The photographed view of a not completely closed door, raddled office furniture or a crooked hung portrait of Erich Honecker on the wall, is an artistic visualization of the evidence that the regime was an ailing system long before the fall of the Wall. The images were taken 15 years after the fall of the wall, in rooms, which Daniel and Geo Fuchs still found in their initial condition. In compliance with the status-quo, the artists photographed solely during daylight. The only style element for each picture is the same calculated central point, which seems to drag the viewer into the room.‘Forces’ is a project, which concentrates on military and warfare. For this series, Daniel and Geo Fuchs used their sober and distant point of view to put single objects like jets, weapons, grenades, and projectiles in the center of their attention - in front of their camera. In the artistic interpretation of Daniel and Geo Fuchs a hand grenade evolves, separated from its original destructive purpose, into an object of extraordinary fascination and aesthetics, a T-mine turns into a stylish beauty.

Aesthetics and destruction are also the subject in the work series ‘Nature and Destruction’''.

Nature as Daniel and Geo Fuchs see it, is beauty, offering resources and energy - and at the same time confrontation with the destruction of nature caused by the impact of humankind. In the series “Explosions’ as part of “Nature and Destruction’, this contradiction finds its culmination. The fascination about the breathtaking force of a blasting power, which might be the Big Bang, where all life originates from, blends with the uneasiness about the destruction, which an explosion causes that is triggered by man. Questions about parallels in contemporary, political events are subliminally posed.

The latest project of Daniel and Geo Fuchs - labeled by the artists as “matter of the heart/labor of love” - is the ‘Halva Art Project’. Halva is the name of a female Russian Toy Terrier, that has lived since October 2014 with the pair.

The project started with an oil portrait, which the painter Gertrud Fuchs, Daniels mother, painted based on a photo of Halva. Unaware of what it could turn into, the artist couple published a photo of the oil portrait on the social media platform ‘Facebook’. Excited that Daniel and Geo Fuchs had accommodated a little dog, many befriended artists were inspired by the photograph and based on it their own portrayals of Halva. This led Daniel and Geo Fuchs to the idea that artists of any genre create an artistic interpretation of little Halva. To realize the project the duo started, in 2015, traveling to shootings with Halva, often in their motor home.

During their, to date, not finished journey, Halva already has been photographed by Anton Corbijn, Michael Wesely, Alfred Steffen and Olaf Heine

In the development of this project are parallels to the journeys of Bernd and Hilla Becher in their VW-Bus, as well as to the travel diary of John Steinbeck “The Journey with Charley: In search of America’s", who in 1960 undertook a three months journey through the USA with his already 10 year old French Poodle Charley in a specially designed Pickup-Camper, to revisit and rediscover the country he had been raised in and described in his novels.

Yet different to John Steinbeck is, that in Daniel and Geo Fuchs’ project, the dog is not just company, but the purpose for the journey. The goal is always to meet somewhere with renowned representatives of the art world, who create an artwork, which visualizes the Russian Toy Terrier female dog Halva. The idea, as well as realization, turned this project into something unique in the art world, as Halva will be the first dog, which at an uncertainly dated project end, has been photographed, painted, and drawn by a huge number of artists.

Exhibition conditions
Already in the production process of their photography series, Daniel and Geo Fuchs consider the respective form of the presentation in the exhibition room. An always recurring feature is the large size/format which admittedly represents a formal attribute, but is not separated from the content. The large size offers the viewer the chance to pay attention to the richness in detail of each single work. The toys in ‘Toy Giants’,  fascinates because the enlarged focus is driven on components, which are often neglected or even ignored. Traces of usage like scratches or not accurately executed painting during production, reveal the individual story, which each serial manufactured product might offer.

In reference to the style of the formalize preserved body, usually kept in a glass container, the photographs of the ‘Conserving’ series are concealed as Cibachrome prints behind 3/5’’ inch thick acrylic glass with polished edges, which as a desired effect suggests the floating of a medical preserved specimen in liquid.

Exhibitions

Selected solo exhibitions
Source

2017
 Haugar Art Museum, Tonsberg, Norwegen - "Reality Check"
2015
 Pori Art Museum Finland, Toy Giants, Forces & Explosion
 Pori Art Museum Finland, STASI – Secret Rooms
2014
 Nikolaj Kunsthal, Copenhagen, – secret rooms
 Stiftung/ Foundation Starke Foundation Starke, Löwenpalais Grunewald Berlin, STASI – secret rooms
 Schacher – Raum für Kunst Stuttgart (Space for Art, Stuttgart), STASI – secret rooms
 Gallery Molliné Stuttgart, Toy Giants
 Gallery Clairefontaine Luxemburg, FORCES
2013
 Fotografins Hus – Stockholm, STASI – secret rooms
2011
 Kunsthalle Wien, TOY GIANTS - Outer Space – within the scope of the exhibition 
2010
 ARTITLED! Contemporary Art, Herpen, The Netherlands, Forest
 Galerie Magda Danysz, Paris, France, Daniel & Geo Fuchs
 ADN Galeria Barcelona, Spain, FORCES
 Young Gallery Knokke, Belgium, new works
2009
 Museo Santander, STASI – secret rooms
 Young Gallery, Brussels, Toy Giants
2008
 FOAM Fotografiemuseum (Photography Museum) Amsterdam, STASI – secret rooms
 Foundation Starke, Löwenpalais Grunewald Berlin, in liquid
 Gallery Clairefontaine Luxemburg, Toy Giants and STASI – secret rooms
 Art House Centre PasquArt / Photoforum Biel, STASI – secret rooms
 City Gallery Wolfsburg, Toy Giants
2007
 ADN Galeria Barcelona, works of a decade
 Gallery Le Lieu, Lorient, STASI – secret rooms
 Gallery dix9, Paris, STASI – secret rooms
 Gedenkstätte Deutsche Teilung (Memorial of German Division) Marienborn, 
 STASI – secret rooms
 Artempus, Düsseldorf, Toy Giants
 Palau de la Virreina, Barcelona, STASI – secret rooms
2006
 Museum Villa Stuck, München, Toys
 Museum Villa Stuck, München, STASI – secret rooms
 Chronicle Forum, Leipzig, STASI – secret rooms
 City Gallery, Neunkirchen, STASI – secret rooms
2005
 Photo forum West, Innsbruck, Famous Eyes
2004
 Forum de l'Image, Toulouse, Conserving
 Kunstverein Lippe, Detmold, Famous Eyes
 Stiftung Starke, Berlin, Famous Eyes
 Photoforum PasquArt, Biel/Bienne, Conserving
2003
 Flatland Gallery, Utrecht, Famous Eyes – Conserving
 Gallery Clairefontaine, Luxembourg, Luxembourg Portraits
2002
 Art House / Barlach Halle K, Hamburg, Famous Eyes
 Photology, Milano, For your eyes only
 Gallery Clairefontaine, Luxembourg, Famous Eyes
 Camera Work, Berlin, book presentation Famous Eyes
2001
 Congress Center Saar, Saarbrücken, Conserving
 Medical-History Museum, Zürich, Conserving
 Camera Work / Berliner Medizinhistorisches Museum, Berlin, Conserving
 State Bank Berlin, slide-projection: Conserving – Rammstein
2000
 Gallery Le Réverbère, Lyon, Conserving
 Stephen Bulger Gallery, Toronto, Conserving
 Rencontres internationales de la photographie, Arles, Conserving
 Natural-History Museum, Basel, Conserving
 Photography Forum International, Frankfurt am Main, Conserving
 Galerie Nei Liicht, Dudelange, Conserving Fish
 Barlach Halle K, Hamburg, Conserving
1999
 Art House / Barlach Halle K, Hamburg, Espada
1998
 Barlach Halle K, Hamburg, Conserving Fish
 Gallery Nei Liicht, Dudelange, Espada
 gallery & edition m, Leipzig, Im falschen Körper (In the wrong body)
1997
 Schirn Kunsthalle, Frankfurt am Main, Espada
 Neue Gesellschaft für bildende Kunst (New society of fine arts), Berlin, 
 Im falschen Körper (In the wrong body)
 Grundbuchhalle, Hamburg, Menschen in der Psychiatrie (Humans in Psychiatrie) 
1996
 Halle K3 Kampnagel, Hamburg, Im falschen Körper (In the wrong body)
1995
 Gasteig, Munich, Im falschen Körper (In the wrong body)
 Römer, Frankfort am Main, Im falschen Körper (In the wrong body)
 Schauspiel, Frankfurt am Main, Die Unbehausten (The Homeless)

Selected group exhibitions and art fairs
Source
2015
 Brandts Museum Odense, Selfie – from self-portrait to staging the self
 Villa Merkel, Gallery of City Esslingen, Hunters & Collectors in Contemporary Art
 KunstRAI Amsterdam, Artitled Contemporary, Herten
 AAF Maastricht, Artitled Contemporary, Herten
 SAP international education center Walldorf, Thinking, Acting, Reflecting
2014
 Museum Morsbroich Leverkusen, Hunters & Collectors in Contemporary Art
 KunstRAI Amsterdam, Artitled Contemporary Herten
 Alfred-Ehrhardt-Stiftung Berlin, Wild
 LWL Industry Museum Lage, Underworlds – A Different Perspective of Things
 Riga Corner House, Riga 2014 European Capital of Culture, The (re)construction of 
 friendship
 Fotografiska art fair Stockholm, Young Gallery Brussels
 Gallery Clairefontaine, Dali und artists of Gallery Clairefontaine
 Kunstrai Amsterdam, ARTITLED! Contemporary Art Herpen
 Art Karlsruhe, Gallery Clairefontaine, Luxembourg
 AAF Maastricht, ARTITLED! Contemporary Art Herpen
 Wittenstein Innovation Plant Igersheim-Harthausen, Entrepreneur 4.0
2013
 CAC Centro de Arte Contemporaneo Malaga, Art & Toys – Collection Selim Varol
 Gallery Clairefontaine, Luxembourg, looking to learn – learning to look
 Museu de Cadaques, Spain, Olor de Cadaques
 AAF Hamburg, ARTITLED! Contemporary Art, Herpen
 ADN Galeria Barcelona, 10 is more than a number
 AAF Amsterdam, ARTITLED! Contemporary Art, Herpen
 Open Art Fair Utrecht, ARTITLED! Contemporary Art, Herpen
 Art Center Maison Particulière Brussels, Sexe, Argent et Pouvoir
 AAF Brussels, ARTITLED! Contemporary Art, Herpen
2012
 Artist House k/haus Wien, Megacool 4.0
 me collectors room Berlin, Art & Toys – Collection Selim Varol
 Zona Maco Mexico, Mario Mauroner Contemporary Art Vienna
 Arco Madrid, ADN Gallery Barcelona,
 AAF Hamburg, ARTITLED! Contemporary Art, Herpen
 AAF Amsterdam, ARTITLED! Contemporary Art, Herpen
 Artfair Cologne, Toykio gallery, Düsseldorf
 Salone degli incanti ex pescheria Trieste, The Flash of Nature
 Fotofever Brussels, ARTITLED! Contemporary Art, Herpen
 Kunstrai Amsterdam, ARTITLED! Contemporary Art, Herpen
 AAF Brussels, ARTITLED! Contemporary Art, Herpen
 Toykio, Düsseldorf, permanent presentation of “Toy Giants"
2011
 ArtBo Bogota, ADN Galeria Barcelona
 FotoFever Paris, ARTITLED! Contemporary Art Herpen
 Magda Danysz Galerie, Paris, Paris Forever
 Toykio, Düsseldorf, opening exhibition
 Gallery Caprice Horn Berlin, Group Exhibition
 Arts Santa Monica Barcelona, Olor Color
 ARTI 11 Den Haag, ARTITLED! Contemporary Art Herpen
 Viennafair, Vienna, Mario Mauroner Gallery,  Vienna
 TRAFFIC Dubai, THE STATE – works from the Farook Collection
 Artefiera Bologna, ADN Galeria Barcelona
 Realisme 11 Amsterdam, ARTITLED! Contemporary Art Herpen
2010
 Ludwig Forum For International Art, Aachen, Eros & Stasi
 Hardware media art club Dortmund, inter-cool 3.0
 Open Art Fair Utrecht, ARTITLED! Contemporary Art, Herpen
 ARTITLED! Contemporary Art, Herpen, Introducing! – 2009–2010
 Swiss Art Institution, Karlsruhe, Artist Duos – Artist Friends
 swab Barcelona, ADN Gallery, Barcelona
 Arco Madrid, Gallery Caprice Horn, Berlin
 The OMC Gallery for Contemporary Art, Huntington Beach, From Wall To Wall
 Art Brussels, ADN Gallery, Barcelona
 Art Hong Kong, Galerie Caprice Horn, Berlin
 Art Amsterdam, ARTITLED! Contemporary Art, Herpen
2009
 Norton Museum of Art, Palm Beach, Recent Additions to the Norton's Photography Collection
 Open Art Fair, Utrecht, ARTITLED! Contemporary Art, Berghem
 The Andy Warhol Museum Pittsburgh, The End. Analyzing Art in troubled times
 House of Cultures of the World, Berlin, Pictopia
 Affordable Art Fair, Paris, ARTITLED! Contemporary Art
 Art Amsterdam, ARTITLED! Contemporary Art, Berghem
 Fundacion Vallpalou, Lleida, Spain, "Impacte"
 Art Hong Kong, Gallery Caprice Horn, Berlin
 Art Karlsruhe, ARTITLED! Contemporary Art, Berghem
 Art Dubai, Gallery Caprice Horn, Berlin
 Affordable Art Fair, Brussels, ARTITLED! Contemporary Art, Berghem
 Art Fair Eindhoven, ARTITLED! Contemporary Art, Berghem
 Palm Beach 3 – Gallery Caprice Horn, Berlin
2008
 Photo Miami, ADN Gallery Barcelona
 Lineart Gent, ARTITLED! Contemporary Art, Berghem
 Art Paris Abu Dhabi, Gallery Caprice Horn, Berlin
 Affordable Art Fair Amsterdam, ARTITLED! Contemporary Art, Berghem
 Kiaf Korea, Gallery Caprice Horn, Berlin
 Slick Art Fair Paris, ADN Gallery Barcelona
 Slick Art Fair Paris, Gallery dix9 Paris, France
 Open Art Fair, Utrecht, ARTITLED! Contemporary Art, Berghem
 Beyond the Boundaries Gallery Caprice Horn, Berlin
 Portraits – Self-portraits, Gallery Clairefontaine, Luxembourg
 Arte Santander, ADN Gallery, Barcelona
 5 is just a number, ADN Gallery, Barcelona
 Scope, Basel, Gallery Caprice Horn, Berlin
 Art Cologne, Gallery Clairefontaine, Luxembourg
 Art Hong Kong, Gallery Caprice Horn, Berlin
 swab Barcelona, ADN Gallery, Barcelona
 Art Brussels, ADN Gallery, Barcelona
 Art Chicago, Gallery Caprice Horn, Berlin
 Circa Puerto Rico, Gallery Caprice Horn, Berlin
 Maco Mexico, Gallery Caprice Horn, Berlin
 Arco Madrid, ADN Gallery, Barcelona
 Palm Beach art fair, GalleryCaprice Horn, Berlin
2007
 Biennale of Contemporary Art, Thessaloniki
 Ursula-Blickle-Stiftung, Kraichtal, small is beautiful
 Photo Miami, Gallery Caprice Horn, Berlin
 Photo Miami, ADN Gallery, Barcelona
 ACAF New York, Gallery Caprice Horn, Berlin
 Artempus con-temporary gallery, Reflect
 Photo Gallery Vienna, Orte mit Geschichte (Locations with History)
 Gallery Caprice Horn, Berlin - Like there is no tomorrow
 Year_07 Art Projects London, Gallery Caprice Horn, Berlin
 slick contemporary art fair Paris, ADN Gallery, Barcelona
 Modern07 Munich, Gallery Caprice Horn, Berlin
 Preview Berlin, ADN Gallery, Barcelona
 Arte Santander, ADN Gallery, Barcelona
 Gallery Caprice Horn, Berlin, Optical Titillation
 Cornice art fair, Venezia, Gallery Caprice Horn, Berlin
 swab Barcelona, ADN Galeria Barcelona
 dphoto, San Sebastian, Flatland gallery Utrecht
 Kiaf Korea, Caprice Horn Gallery, Berlin
 photo London, Gallery Caprice Horn, Berlin
 Gallery Caprice Horn, Berlin, Reality bites
 Art Brussels, ADN Gallery, Barcelona
 Art Cologne, Caprice Horn Gallery, Berlin
 Art L.A., Caprice Horn Gallery, Berlin
 The OMC Gallery, Huntington Beach, Art - Made in Germany
2006
 Palazzo Cavour, Turin, Other Families
 Vienna Biennale, Vienna
 Potsdam Museum, Auslöser Potsdam (Trigger Potsdam)
 Locarno Film Festival, Movements, Play Forward section
 Caprice Horn Gallery, Berlin, Month of Photography, Refraction
 Photo meeting Luxembourg, Gallery Clairefontaine
 Photo Miami, Caprice Horn Gallery, Berlin
 The OMC Gallery, Huntington Beach, Inauguration
 Photo New York, Caprice Horn Gallery, Berlin
 Paris Photo, Gallery Clairefontaine, Luxembourg
 Art L.A., The OMC Gallery, Huntington Beach
2005
 Museum of Photography, Braunschweig, Polaroid as Gesture
 Photo L.A., The OMC Gallery, Huntington Beach
2004
 art.fair Cologne, The OMC Gallery for Contemporary Art, Düsseldorf & Huntington Beach
 Photo L.A., Gallery Clairefontaine, Luxembourg
2003
 Kunsthal Rotterdam, Four centuries of smoking in art
 International Biennial of photography, Turin
 Photo Museum Den Haag, Mortalis
 Minerva Academy, Groningen, De Voorproef
 Stephen Bulger gallery, Toronto, Suture
 Photology, Milano, Occhio per occhio
 Gallery Clairefontaine, Luxembourg autoportrait+nus
 Paris Photo, Flatland Gallery, Utrecht
 Kunst Rai Amsterdam, Flatland Gallery, Utrecht
 Art Brussels, Gallery Clairefontaine, Luxembourg
 Art Rotterdam, Flatland Gallery, Utrecht
 Artefiera Bologna, Photology Milano
2002
 Muséum national d'histoire naturelle, Paris, Histoire naturelle
 Art Cologne, Gallery Clairefontaine, Luxembourg
 Paris Photo, Gallery Clairefontaine, Luxembourg
2001
 Aipad New York, Stephen Bulger Gallery Toronto
 Muséum d'histoire naturelle, Lyon, Carte blanche
 Fiac Paris, Gallery Le Réverbère, Lyon
 Photo Los Angeles, Stephen Bulger Gallery, Toronto
2000
 Göteborg Museum of Art, New Natural History
 Franckesche Foundation, Halle/Saale, Kinder haben Rechte (Kids have Rights)
 Electricity Plant, Tel Aviv, Prometheus
 Paris Photo, Gallery Le Révèrbere, Lyon
 Art Cologne, Lipanjepuntin Artecontemporanea, Trieste
 Art Brussels, Lipanjepuntin Artecontemporanea, Trieste
 Arco Madrid, Lipanjepuntin Artecontemporanea, Trieste
 Arte Fiera Bologna, Lipanjepuntin Artecontemporanea, Trieste
1999
 National Museum of Photography, Bradford, New Natural History
 Lipanjepuntin Artecontemporanea, Trieste, Still in motion
 Art Cologne, Lipanjepuntin Artecontemporanea, Trieste
1998
 International Photo Scene, Cologne, Espada
 Alte Völklinger Hütte, Völklingen, Prometheus
 Airport Gallery, Frankfort, Die Farbe Grün (The Color Green)
 Art Frankfort, Gallery & edition m Leipzig

Monographs, publications, and catalogs 
     Toy Giants –, 2008
     Toy Giants, Verlag fuer Moderne Kunst Nuernberg, 2007, Nuremberg
     Luxembourg Portraits, Edition Gallery Clairefontaine, 2003
     Famous Eyes, München, 2002 
     Conserving, München, 2000
     Im falschen Körper - In the wrong Body, Publisher Martina Rueger, Wiesbaden, 1995
     Stasi – secret rooms, Museum of Fine Arts Santander, 2008
     Stasi – secret rooms, City Gallery Neunkirchen, 2006

Group exhibition catalogs
     10 Years Art Station, Central Station Wolfsburg, City Gallery Wolfsburg and German Rail AG 2015
     Portraying Visions Entrepreneur 4.0 Award 2014, Publisher  seltmann+sons
     Under-Worlds – The different perspective of Things, Essen 2014
     Gallery Clairefontaine, Looking to learn / Learning to Look, 2013
     Megacool 4.0, Art House k/haus Vienna, / <Kehrer_Verlag|Kehrer Verlag>, Kehrer Publishing 2012
     Art & Toys – Collection Selim Varol, 2012
     Eros and Stasi, Ludwig Forum for International Art, Aachen / <Kehrer_Verlag|Kehrer Verlag>, / Kehrer Publishing, 2011
     Odor Color / Smell Color, Arts Santa Monica / Catalunya, Spain / 
     Universe. The Art and a dream. Kunsthalle Vienna, Verlag fuer Moderne Kunst, Publisher of Modern Art, Nuremberg 2011
     inter-cool 3.0 – Youth Visual Media, Verlag, 2010
     Artist Duos – Kuenstlerpaare, Swiss Art Institution, Karlsruhe, 2011
     Humans. Locations. Times. – Photographs at the Deutsche Historische Museum, 2009
     Impacte, Coleccio Olor Visual, Fundacio Vallpalou, Lleida, Spain, 2009
     Pictoplasma / Prepare For Pictopia]a, Pictoplasma / Haus der Kulturen der Welt / House of Cultures of the World, 2009
     C – Glass Hero, Ivory Press London, 2008
     Foam Album 08, Museum for Photography, Amsterdam, 2009
     Month of Photography, Berlin, 2008
     Thessaloniki Biennale, 2007
     small is beautiful, Ursula Blickle Foundation, 2007
     Other Families, Palazzo Cavour Turin, 2006
     Trigger/ Ausloeser Potsdam, Museum Potsdam, 2006
     Photomeetings Luxembourg, Gallery Clairefontaine, Luxembourg, 2006
     Polaroid als Geste / Polaroid as Gesture, Verlag Hatje Cantz, 2005
     Rookgordijnen – Roken in de kunsten, Kunsthal Rotterdam, 2003
     In Natura, Biennale Internazionale di Fotografia, Torino,2003
     Reality-Check, 2. Triennial of Photography, Hamburg, 2002
     La photographie traversée, Rencontres internationales Arles, 2000
     Histoires Naturelle, Muséum National d’histoire naturelle Paris, 2002
     Carte Blanche, Muséum d’histoire naturelle Lyon, 2001
     Rammstein, Gert Hof, 2001

Slide-projections
     Looking at another world/ pictures of the projects of Daniel & Geo Fuchs from 1992–2002 / 
     CNA – Centre national de l'audiovisuel Luxembourg
     Conserving – Rammstein slide-projection for the first listening session of the Rammstein album Mutter (Mother)

Documentary film
Eye-Catcher – A portrait about Daniel & Geo Fuchs, New Best Friend Film Production, Frankfurt/M. 2001, 45min.

Grants for guest artists
Foundation Starke / Löwenpalais Grunewald, Berlin 2004/2005

References

External links
 Literature of and about Daniel Fuchs in the catalog of the German National Library
 Literature of and about Geo Fuchs in the catalog of the German National Library
 Homepage Daniel & Geo Fuchs
 Index Exhibitions
 Toy Giants

Photographers from Bavaria
Living people
1966 births
Married couples
1969 births
Photographers from Frankfurt